Epiphyas eugramma is a species of moth of the family Tortricidae. It is found in Australia, where it has been recorded from Victoria.

The wingspan is about 16 mm.

References

Moths described in 1899
Epiphyas